James Richard Barthmaier (born January 6, 1984) is a former American professional baseball pitcher.

Professional Baseball Career

Houston Astros
Barthmaier was drafted by the Houston Astros in the 13th round (389th overall) of the 2003 Major League Baseball draft out of Roswell High School in Roswell, Georgia. At the time, he was the first player drafted out of Roswell High School since the Kansas City Royals drafted Ken Ray in 1993. In 2005, with the Lexington Legends, Barthmaier was a South Atlantic League Mid-Season All Star, a SAL Post-Season All Star, and a Baseball America Low Class A All Star. Barhmaier also won SAL pitcher of the week twice, June 12 and August 7, 2005. In 2005, Barthmaier pitched one game for the Salem Avalanche of the Carolina League, pitching six innings in relief. Barthmaier spent the 2006 season with Salem, pitching 146 2/3 innings with a 3.62 ERA. He won Carolina League pitcher of the week on August 20, 2006. Barthmaier was claimed off waivers by the Pittsburgh Pirates on November 20, 2007.

Pittsburgh Pirates
The Pittsburgh Pirates claimed Barthmaier on waivers on November 20, 2007. He made his Major League Baseball debut with Pittsburgh on June 27, 2008. He took the loss, giving up 7 runs in 2 1/3 innings against the Tampa Bay Rays; giving up home runs to Evan Longoria and Eric Hinske, but striking out Scott Kazmir and Carlos Peña.  Coming into the 2009 season, Barthmaier was rated the number 12 prospect in the Pirates’ farm system by Baseball America. After facing two batters, Barthmaier exited his first 2009 start with an elbow injury and needed Tommy John surgery. During the 2009 and 2010 spring trainings, he was sent to the team's Triple-A affiliate, the Indianapolis Indians. On May 26, 2010, Barthmaier was sent to the Pirates' Single A affiliate, the Bradenton Marauders. 
He appeared in two games for the Marauders, allowing a run in three innings.
Barthmaier, who was recovering from Tommy John surgery, then headed to the Pirates' Double A affiliate, the Altoona Curve, on June 2, 2010. He appeared in five games for the Curve, allowing 4 earned runs in 3 innings. The Pirates released Barthmaier on June 23, 2010.

Washington Nationals
The Washington Nationals signed Barthmaier on June 29, 2010. He finished the 2010 season with the GCL Nationals in the Gulf Coast League and the Potomac Nationals of the Carolina League. In 2011, Barthmaier pitched for the Double A Harrisburg Senators, posting a 5.05 ERA in 67 2/3 innings.

References

External links

1984 births
Living people
Martinsville Astros players
Greeneville Astros players
Lexington Legends players
Salem Avalanche players
Corpus Christi Hooks players
Altoona Curve players
Indianapolis Indians players
Pittsburgh Pirates players
Bradenton Marauders players
Gulf Coast Nationals players
Potomac Nationals players
Harrisburg Senators players
People from Roswell, Georgia
Baseball players from Atlanta